The 2006–07 EDF Energy Cup marked the 36th season of English domestic rugby union cup competition. It was the second season under the Anglo-Welsh Cup format and the first with EDF Energy as title sponsor. The competition began on 1 September and concluded with the final on Sunday 15 April at Twickenham, where Leicester Tigers beat the Ospreys 41–35.

The teams competing remained the same as the previous season with the exception of newly promoted NEC Harlequins replacing Leeds Tykes, who were relegated to National Division One.

Group stage

Group A

Group B

Group C

Group D

Semi-finals

Final

Broadcast rights
Television rights for the competition were held exclusively by BBC Sport, with games shown as part of the BBC's Grandstand and Scrum V programmes, and on Welsh-language channel S4C.

See also 
2006–07 English Premiership (rugby union)
2006–07 Celtic League

References

2006–07 in Welsh rugby union
2006–07 English Premiership (rugby union)
2006-07
EDF